Railway Troops of the Russian Armed Forces are a railway troops service in the Logistical Support of the Russian Armed Forces. They are involved in ensuring the defense of Russia. Railway Troops perform the tasks of rail services (preparation, construction, reconstruction and protection of the objects of railways). It is the oldest such force in the world, established in 1851, as a unit in the engineering corps of the Imperial Russian Army. The professional holiday of the Troops is celebrated on August 6.

History
Railway Troops were first established August 6, 1851 by decree of Emperor Nicholas I. In accordance with the document "Regulations on the Management of St. Petersburg – Moscow railway" was formed by 14 separate companies of military-workers, 2 companies of conductors and 1 telegraphy company. The total number reached 4,340 people. 

The task of the first military railway units was to support the working conditions of railway tracks, crossings, bridges, and their protection. Railroad became part of the Corps of Engineers since its inception in 1870. First, in the form of train teams, and since 1876 – railroad battalions. Railway formed part of the Corps of Engineers until 1908 inclusive. They were then isolated in a separate category and are subject to military service messages (Military Communications of the Red Army, VOSO) of the General Staff.

During the Russo-Turkish War of 1877–78, staff provided continuous supply to the Russian army along railways specially built by the force, including the Bender – Galati route. During World War I, the personnel of the units built about 300 kilometers broad gauge railway and up to 4,000 km of narrow gauge, restored more than 4,600 kilometers of track and nearly 5,000 kilometers of telephone and telegraph lines associated with railway tracks.

Organization

In connection with the reorganization of the Armed Forces of the Russian Federation after the dissolution of the Soviet Union, located in the territory of the Russian Federation Presidential Decree signed on 18 April 1992 №392 "On the Railway Troops of the Russian Federation" General Directorate of railway troops, units, units, agencies, military and educational institutions and enterprises of railway troops, stationed in the Russian Federation, have been taken under the jurisdiction of the Russian Federation.

Presidential Decree of 30 September 1992 №1148 "On the structure of the central bodies of federal executive power" General Directorate of Railway Troops of the Ministry of Architecture, Building and Housing of was reorganized into the Federal Railway Troops of the Ministry of Railways of the Russian Federation, by thus taking them out of the Armed Forces control.

On 7 August 1995 Federal Law of 5 August 1995 N 126-FZ "On the Railway Troops of the Russian Federation" entered into force. According to Presidential Decree №903 signed on September 7, 1995 the Federal Railway Troops of the Ministry of Railways of the Russian Federation were reorganized into the Federal service of railway troops of the Russian Federation.

In accordance with Presidential Decree signed on 3 March 2004 №314 "On the system and structure of federal executive agencies" the Federal Railway Troops Service was abolished and its functions transferred to the Russian Ministry of Defense. The provisions of the decree concerning the Federal Railway Troops of the Russian Federation entered into force after the entry into force of the federal law (Federal Law of 29 June 2004 N 58-FZ). On October 5, 2004 the troops became subordinated to the Russian Armed Forces Rear Service.

Units (2017)
5th Separate Railway Brigade (Abakan)
7th Separate Railway Brigade (Komsomolsk-on-Amur)
9th Separate Railway Brigade (Syzran)
29th Separate Railway Brigade (Bryansk)
34th Separate Railway Brigade (Ryazan)
37th Separate Railway Brigade (Nevinnomyssk, Georgiyevsk)
38th Separate Railway Brigade (Vologda)
39th Separate Railway Brigade (Krasnodar)
43rd Separate Railway Brigade (Yekaterinburg)
48th Separate Railway Brigade (Omsk)
50th Separate Railway Brigade (Svobodny)
333rd Separate Railway Brigade (Volgograd)
118th Separate Pontoon-Bridge Railway Battalion (Khabarovsk)
333rd Separate Pontoon-Bridge Railway Battalion (Volgograd)

Equipment
At the disposal of railway troops are complex high-performance machines and tools, advanced design and equipment for rehabilitation and construction of railways. The complex includes:
track machines
pile-driving and blasting equipment
overhead traveling cranes
railway cranes
collapsible structure and support
inventory collapsible trestle
specialized equipment floating bridges
Armoured trains

Further reading

 Железнодорожный транспорт: Энциклопедия / Гл. ред. Н. С. Конарев. —М.: Большая Российская энциклопедия.

See also
Awards and emblems of the Ministry of Defence of the Russian Federation

References

External links

Military units and formations of Russia
1851 establishments in the Russian Empire